59th National Board of Review Awards

Best Picture: 
 Empire of the Sun 
The 59th National Board of Review Awards were announced on December 15, 1987, and given on 16 February, 1988.

Top 10 films
Empire of the Sun
The Last Emperor
Broadcast News
The Untouchables
Gaby: A True Story
Cry Freedom
Fatal Attraction
Hope and Glory
Wall Street
Full Metal Jacket

Top Foreign Films
Jean de Florette and Manon des Sources
My Life as a Dog
Au revoir les enfants
Tampopo
Dark Eyes

Winners
Best Picture: 
Empire of the Sun
Best Foreign Language Film (tie):
Jean de Florette, France
Manon des sources (Manon of the Spring), France
Best Actor: 
Michael Douglas - Wall Street
Best Actress (tie): 
Lillian Gish - The Whales of August
Holly Hunter - Broadcast News
Best Supporting Actor: 
Sean Connery - The Untouchables
Best Supporting Actress: 
Olympia Dukakis - Moonstruck
Best Director: 
Steven Spielberg - Empire of the Sun
Best Performance by a Juvenile Actor (special citation)
Christian Bale - Empire of the Sun
Best Documentary:
Chuck Berry Hail! Hail! Rock 'n' Roll
Career Achievement Award:
Lillian Gish

External links
National Board of Review of Motion Pictures :: Awards for 1987

1987
1987 film awards
1987 in American cinema